Boitumelo Elizabeth "Pinky" Moloi is a South African politician who is currently serving as the Deputy Minister of Employment and Labour. She was formerly the Executive Mayor of Dr Kenneth Kaunda District Municipality in the North West province. She is a member of the African National Congress (ANC) and in 2017 was elected to a second five-year term on its National Executive Committee.

Career 
Moloi was the Executive Mayor of the North West's Dr Kenneth Kaunda District Municipality, previously known as Southern District Municipality, for several years. She held the office by October 2007 and remained in place in July 2015. In January 2012, however, the local leadership of the African National Congress (ANC) in the region announced that it would "recall" Moloi – that is, it would withdraw its support for her leadership and endeavour to remove her from office if she did not resign. The local ANC told the press that Moloi was one of two mayors who were "not co-operating with the organisation [the ANC] and do things their own way". However, the Provincial Executive Committee of the ANC in the North West – a more senior body – reversed the decision.

At the party's 53rd National Conference in December 2012, Moloi was elected to a five year-term on the ANC National Executive Committee. She was re-elected at the 54th National Conference in December 2017, receiving the support of the North West branch of the ANC.

She was elected as a Member of the National Assembly in the 2019 general election, having been ranked 62nd on the ANC's electoral list. In the aftermath of the election, the ANC Women's League lobbied for Moloi's appointment as Premier of the North West. Instead, on 29 May 2019, President Cyril Ramaphosa announced that Moloi would be Deputy Minister for Employment and Labour, serving under Minister Thulas Nxesi.

Personal life 
She was hospitalised on 5 January 2021 and tested positive for COVID-19.

References

External link 

 

Living people
African National Congress politicians
Members of the National Assembly of South Africa
Year of birth missing (living people)